Kutluca may refer to:

 Kutluca, Besni, a village in the district of Besni, Adıyaman Province
 Kutluca, Çorum
 Kutluca, Gümüşhacıköy, a village in the district of Gümüşhacıköy, Amasya Province
 Kutluca, İznik
 Kutluca, Kemaliye